The Employees' New Dormitory and Club, also known as Building 232, is a historic building in Albuquerque, New Mexico. Built in 1931, it is notable as the only surviving building of the Albuquerque Indian School, which operated at this location from 1882 to 1976. It was added to the New Mexico State Register of Cultural Properties in 1981 and the National Register of Historic Places in 1982.

History
The Albuquerque Indian School was established by Presbyterian missionaries in 1881 and moved to its longtime campus on 12th Street the following year. Operated for most of its existence by the Bureau of Indian Affairs (BIA), the institution was an industrial boarding school for Native American boys and girls, most of whom came from the Pueblos of New Mexico and the Navajo Nation. Under the prevailing philosophy of the time, the students were stripped of their native identity and forced to assimilate into white American culture using strict military-style discipline. Eventually, however, this educational model fell out of favor and the Indian School struggled to maintain a sense of purpose later in the 20th century. It relocated to Santa Fe in 1976 and closed for good a few years later. The Albuquerque campus was left to deteriorate and all of the buildings but one were demolished in the 1980s.

The Employees' New Dormitory (Building 232) was built in 1931 and originally housed living and dining space for school faculty members. After the school closed, the building remained in use as a regional headquarters of the BIA, which prevented it from being demolished along with the rest of the campus. In 2011, the Indian School property was handed over from the BIA to the All Pueblo Council for redevelopment. The BIA had planned to demolish Building 232, but it was saved at the behest of the Society for the Preservation of American Indian Culture. In 2013 the building was completely renovated and it now houses the Native American Community Academy, a charter school for Native Americans.

Architecture
Located at the extreme southern end of the former Indian School campus, the Employees' New Dormitory is a two-story, U-shaped building with the main block facing Indian School Road and two wings extending to the rear. It is designed in the Mission Revival style with a hipped tile roof, stuccoed walls, and arched window and door openings. The street facade is symmetrical, with two main entrance porches whose gable ends are topped with ornamental curved parapets. The facade is also decorated with three decorative shield emblems, one in the center and one over each entrance. The ground floor windows are arched, while those on the second floor are smaller and rectangular. The interior layout was modified during the 2013 renovation.

References

School buildings on the National Register of Historic Places in New Mexico
Buildings and structures in Albuquerque, New Mexico
School buildings completed in 1931
New Mexico State Register of Cultural Properties
National Register of Historic Places in Albuquerque, New Mexico
Native American history of New Mexico